"Let's Get Together" is a song written by Robert and Richard Sherman for the 1961 Disney film The Parent Trap.

Background
It was sung in the film by teen actress Hayley Mills, using double-tracking because she played both the roles of twin sisters.
Annette Funicello and Tommy Sands also did a version of the song in the film, which is heard during the dance at the summer camp.

Chart performance
When released on disc, the song debuted on the Billboard Hot 100 in September 1961 (b/w "Cobbler, Cobbler") and went on to become a top 10 hit, peaking at number 8.  The credit on the single reads "Hayley Mills and Hayley Mills", a tongue-in-cheek reference to Mills apparently singing a duet with herself. Released in the UK, it reached the top 20, peaking at number 17. In 1963, the song reached #1 in Mexico. The song's success led Mills to record an album, Let's Get Together with Hayley Mills, which included "Let's Get Together" and Mills' only other hit song, "Johnny Jingo."

Cover versions
A Spanish-language cover of the song, titled "Vayamos Juntos" and recorded by Las Hermanas Jiménez, was one of the most successful recordings of 1963 in that country.
The Go-Go's performed a cover on DisneyMania 5 and a live version recorded by Oh-OK is compiled on The Complete Recordings.

Homages
A homage to the original appeared in the 1998 remake of the film, with Lindsay Lohan singing the title line, and Nobody's Angel performing the soundtrack version.

References

External links 
"Let's Get Together" on YouTube

1961 songs
1961 singles
Hayley Mills songs
Disney songs
Number-one singles in Mexico
Songs written by the Sherman Brothers
Songs written for films
The Parent Trap films